Events from the year 1207 in Ireland.

Incumbent
Lord: John

Events
 The town of New Ross (the town of the new bridge) was granted a Royal Charter.
 Callan, County Kilkenny was founded by William the Marshall.
 The Normans attempted to build a motte and bailey at Brian Boru's Fort but were driven off
 Hugh de Lacy destroyed Clones Abbey and the town of Clones

Births

Deaths

References

 
1200s in Ireland
Ireland
Years of the 13th century in Ireland